The Sale Football Netball Club, nicknamed the Magpies, is an Australian rules football and netball club based in Sale, Victoria and are based at the Sale Oval.

The club teams compete in the Gippsland Football Netball League (GFNL).

History 
Founded in 1877, Sale began playing official competitive football in 1889 when they joined the Gippsland Football Association, as a junior side. In 1900, the club entered the senior competition and were premiers for the first time the following year.

One of the greatest players produced by the club, Brownlow Medal winner Norman Ware, came to Footscray from Sale in the 1930s.

Sale were a foundation member of the Latrobe Valley Football League in 1954. They were the dominant team in the early years of the competition, with four premierships in the first six seasons. More recently, Sale defeated Maffra to win the 2012 grand final.

Football Premierships
Seniors
 Payne Challenge Cup
1889 
 Gippsland & Feilchenfeld Cup
1892 
 Gippsland Football Association / League (10)
 1901?, 1911, 1924, 1927, 1931, 1934, 1937, 1949, 1950, 1953
 Latrobe Valley Football League (8)
 1954, 1955, 1957, 1959, 1971, 1973, 1975, 1986
 West Gippsland Latrobe Football League (1)
 2008
 Gippsland Football League (1)
 2012

Club records

Individual
Most games
Jack Schuback – 400+

Most Best & Fairest
Shane Fyfe – 5

Most goals in a game
Shane Loveless – 15 (vs Churchill in 1987)

Most goals in a season
Shane Loveless – 140 (1987)

Team
Highest score
39.20 (254) (versus Moe in 1997)

Football League best and Fairest Winners
Gippsland FL
Trood Award
1935 - Arthur Davidson
1936 - Jack Collins
1946 - Leo Brennan (Sale Greens)
1952 - Bob Mason

La Trobe Valley FNL
Trood Award / Rodda Medal
1954 – Bob Mason 
1955 – Bob Mason
1957 – John Nix

Gippsland Football League
Trood Award / Rodda Medal
2009 – Adrian Cox
2012 – Luke Collins
2017 - Kane Martin

Coaches

VFL / AFL Players

The following footballers played with Sale FC before making their senior VFL / AFL football debut.
1906 - Robert Michael - Collingwood
1911 - Vic Trood - University
1919 - Stewart McLatchie - Carlton
1926 - Ed Ryan - Fitzroy
1930 - Wally Ware - Hawthorn
1932 - Harvey Johnson - Hawthorn
1932 - Norman Ware - Footscray
1945 - Jack Mitchell - Melbourne
1939 - Arthur Davidson - Sale
1961 - Ian Collins - Carlton
1980 - Andrew Pollett - Footscray
1994 - Stuart Anderson - North Melbourne
2003 - Jacob Schuback - Adelaide 
2006 - Scott Pendlebury - Collingwood

References

External links

 Facebook page
 Gippsland FNL Best & Fairest Winners
 Sale at Australian Football.com

Australian rules football clubs in Victoria (Australia)
Australian rules football clubs established in 1877
1877 establishments in Australia
Gippsland Football League
Sale, Victoria
Netball teams in Victoria (Australia)